Après La Classe is a ska band from the Province of Lecce, Italy. The band is composed by six members: a singer, a guitarist, a bassist, a drummer, an organist and a disk-jockey.

Band history
Formed in 1996, the band changed its line-up in 1999 and 2002 beginning to play in regional music events with the record label "Edel Italia".
The debut album was "Après la Classe" (2002) with the disco and radio hit "Paris". This song was also selected in 2006 as theme song for national commercial and for TV program Le Iene. Their second album "Un numero" was released in 2004.

Linked to Salento traditional music, Après la Classe re-arranged and presented again classical songs like "Kalì Nifta", "Lu rusciu te lu mare", and famous Italian cover songs like Adriano Pappalardo's "Ricominciamo".

They played also with other Italian famous ska and reggae bands, such as Sud Sound System, and the rapper Caparezza. Their genres are pop, rock, ska and dance. The singer also sings in French. 

In 2006 the album "Lunapark" was released for On the road music factory label, anticipated by a national tour.

They also took part in three editions of the Concerto del Primo Maggio in Rome (2007, 2008 and 2009).

The band was the protagonist of a pictures book, published in November 2009, and called "Il Ritmo Nel Tacco", with Sud Sound System, Raffaele Casarano and Cesare Dell'Anna. The preface author was Caparezza.

"Mammalitaliani", in collaboration of Caparezza, was released in summer 2010.

Band members
 Cesko Arcuti - singer
 Francois Rekkia - drummer
 Valerio "Combass" Bruno - bassist
 Puccia - accordion

Discography

Album
2002 - Après La Classe
2004 - Un numero
2006 - Lunapark
2008 - Lunapark on Tour
2010 - Mammalitaliani
2022 - Santa Marilena

Singles
1999 - Pazzo di te
2004 - Sale la febbre
2004 - A fiate
2008 - Il miracolo
2010 - Mammalitaliani

Notes

External links
Official site
Après La Classe pictures

Italian musical groups
Musical groups from Apulia